Bannockburn is a village in West Deerfield and Vernon townships in Lake County, Illinois, United States. Per the 2020 census, the population was 1,013. The village is generally considered part of the Chicago area's North Shore region. The Friedman house by Frank Lloyd Wright is located in Bannockburn.

Named for the Scottish village of Bannockburn, the village began construction in 1924 and was incorporated in 1929. Aitken designed his development for the affluent members of his bridge and country club. His plan for Bannockburn featured large lots to imitate country living, and this design has been preserved; in fact, the original  minimum on home lots has been increased to two.

Gradually, Bannockburn expanded its boundaries to its current . The Tri-State Tollway was built through the village in the 1950s, encouraging growth, though traffic noise pollution has been a persistent local concern. In the late 1960s Bannockburn's citizens, after some debate, approved the construction of the first of several business parks along the village's northern edge. It created its first commercial zone in 1984 along Illinois Route 22. Bannockburn's municipal services expanded slowly in an effort to limit taxes, but it established a police department in the 1970s and built a village hall in 1992.

Geography

The Tri-State Tollway forms the village's western boundary, with the village of Lincolnshire present on the other side of the highway; the city of Lake Forest borders the village to the north, and the village of Deerfield lies to the south. The lake-side communities of Highwood and Highland Park lie directly to the east, separating Bannockburn from Lake Michigan.

Demographics

2020 census

Note: the US Census treats Hispanic/Latino as an ethnic category. This table excludes Latinos from the racial categories and assigns them to a separate category. Hispanics/Latinos can be of any race.

2000 Census
As of the census of 2000, there were 1,429 people, 250 households, and 222 families residing in the village. The racial makeup of the village was 87.54% White, 3.36% African American, 0.07% Native American, 5.11% Asian, 0.07% Pacific Islander, 1.68% from other races, and 2.17% from two or more races. Hispanic or Latino of any race were 3.50% of the population.

There were 250 households, out of which 40.8% had children under the age of 18 living with them, 84.0% were married couples living together, 3.6% had a female householder with no husband present, and 10.8% were non-families. 7.2% of all households were made up of individuals, and 2.4% had someone living alone who was 65 years of age or older. The average household size was 2.96 and the average family size was 3.11.

In the village, the population was spread out, with 14.6% under the age of 18, 46.7% from 18 to 24, 16.0% from 25 to 44, 16.4% from 45 to 64, and 6.2% who were 65 years of age or older. The median age was 22 years. For every 100 females, there were 102.7 males. For every 100 females age 18 and over, there were 101.0 males.

The median income for a household in the village was $150,415, and the median income for a family was $151,825.  The per capita income for the village was $39,303. About 2.3% of families and 3.0% of the population were below the poverty line, including 3.5% of those under age 18 and none of those age 65 or over.

Economy 
Companies based in Bannockburn include Stericycle.

Education

The village of Bannockburn is home to Bannockburn Elementary School District 106, a small one-facility district of approximately 200 students from Bannockburn and communities east of the Tri-State Tollway. These students attend Deerfield High School for grades 9-12. Those to the west of the highway are served by Lincolnshire-Prairie View School District 103, and Adlai E. Stevenson District 125. Part of Trinity International University's campus is located within the boundaries of Bannockburn.

Government

Similar to other communities in the area, the Village of Bannockburn functions on a Board of six trustees, a village president, and a salaried full-time village manager that helps monitor and guide the administration and services for the Village of Bannockburn. The six trustees are residents of Bannockburn and are elected to staggered four-year terms.  Each trustee is given the responsibility for a department of government activities. The village's president and clerk are elected to two-year terms.  As a small community, Bannockburn relies on neighboring Deerfield for a number of essential services.

Notable people 

Mike Ditka, player and coach with the Chicago Bears, two-time Super Bowl champion, previous resident
 Kirk Hinrich, player with the Chicago Bulls (2003–2010, 2012–2016), Washington Wizards (2010–2011), and Atlanta Hawks (2011–2012, 2016); previous resident
 Phil Jackson, coach of the Chicago Bulls and Los Angeles Lakers; previous resident
 Joakim Noah, center for the Memphis Grizzlies, Chicago Bulls; previous resident
 Ron Santo, third baseman for the Chicago Cubs; previous resident
Orlando Pace, offensive lineman with the Chicago Bears and St. Louis Rams; previous resident
Chance the Rapper, Chicago rapper; current resident

References

External links
Village of Bannockburn official website

Villages in Illinois
Villages in Lake County, Illinois
Populated places established in 1924